This is a list of radio stations in Costa Rica.

Radio stations

See also
Media of Costa Rica
Radios de Costa Rica

References 

Costa Rica
Radio